Fires Within Fires is the eleventh studio album by American post-metal band Neurosis. The album was released on September 23, 2016, via the band's own record label, Neurot Recordings. Recording began on December 27, 2015, at Electrical Audio Studio; the album was produced by Steve Albini and the cover art created by Thomas Hooper. Like Neurosis' previous albums, Fires Within Fires combines "elements from the post-metal genre they co-created [with] elements of industrial, doom, punk and folk". This is the band's final album with founding member Scott Kelly who was fired in 2019 due to domestic abuse allegations, which he officially confirmed to be true and announced his withdrawal from the public eye in August 2022.

Critical reception

The album received an average score of 85/100 from 10 reviews on Metacritic, indicating "universal acclaim". Thom Jurek of AllMusic wrote, "Given [the album's] relative brevity, it's among the few albums in their catalog that doesn't leave the listener exhausted (not a bad thing by any means), but wanting more." The A.V. Club writer, J.J. Anselmi, said, "Fires Within Fires is yet another invaluable contribution from this legendary band."

Accolades

Track listing

Personnel
Neurosis
 Scott Kelly – vocals, guitar
 Dave Edwardson – bass, backing vocals
 Jason Roeder – drums, percussions
 Steve Von Till – guitar, vocals
 Noah Landis – keyboards, synthesizers, effects, backing vocals

Technical personnel
 Steve Albini – production
 Thomas Hooper – artwork

Charts

References

External links
 

2016 albums
Neurosis (band) albums
Neurot Recordings albums
Albums produced by Steve Albini
Post-metal albums
Sludge metal albums
Doom metal albums by American artists
Folk metal albums